Tatsuro Hirooka (広岡 達朗, Hirooka Tatsurō born February 9, 1932) is a retired Japanese professional baseball player and manager. 

Hirooka played his entire career, from 1954 to 1966, for the Yomiuri Giants. He was awarded the Central League rookie of the year award in 1954. From 1961 to 1966, Hirooka was a player-coach for the Giants.

As a manager for the Yakult Swallows (1976–1979) and then the Seibu Lions (1982–1985), Hirooka was known for his tough-love style. He thrice led his teams to the Japan Series championship — in 1978, 1982, and 1983. He won the Matsutaro Shoriki Award — presented to a person (a manager or player) who greatly contributes to the development of professional baseball — in 1978 and 1982.

References

Notes 

1932 births
Possibly living people
People from Kure, Hiroshima
Japanese baseball players
Yomiuri Giants players
Managers of baseball teams in Japan
Tokyo Yakult Swallows managers
Seibu Lions managers
Nippon Professional Baseball Rookie of the Year Award winners
Japanese Baseball Hall of Fame inductees